Azad Deh (also Romanized as Āzād Deh; also known as Mīshqāl and Mūshqāl) is a village in Bagh-e Keshmir Rural District, Salehabad County, Razavi Khorasan Province, Iran. At the 2006 census, its population was 1,577, in 343 families.

See also 

 List of cities, towns and villages in Razavi Khorasan Province

References 

Populated places in   Torbat-e Jam County